Scare Yourself is the ninth album by Danish rock band D-A-D. The album was released on 23 May 2005.

Track listing
 "Lawrence of Suburbia" - 4:31
 "A Good Day (To Give It Up)" - 3:09
 "Scare Yourself" - 3:36
 "No Hero" - 3:08
 "Hey Now" - 3:44
 "Camping in Scandinavia" - 3:52
 "Unexplained" - 3:26
 "Little Addict" - 3:39
 "Dirty Fairytale" - 2:45
 "Allright" - 4:05
 "Last Chance to Change" - 3:31
 "You Filled My Head" (Bonus Track)*
Only found as a bonus track in regions outside Scandinavia.

Japanese Edition Bonus Track
  12 "Big Ones" - 5:02

To date the album has sold 50,000 copies in Denmark.

Charts

References

External links
D-A-D official website

2005 albums
D.A.D. (band) albums